Striker Ian Muir scored 21 goals as Tranmere Rovers F.C. won promotion in the 1988–89 season. John King's side failed to win any of their opening four league games, but lost just two of their next eleven matches, whilst also reaching the fourth round of the Littlewoods Cup. The 1–0 victory at Scunthorpe United on New Year's Even started a run of only two defeats in 21 games that took Tranmere to the top of the Fourth Division with four matches remaining. Ian Muir and Steve Vickers were ever-present as the team finished runners-up.

Final league table

References 

 

 

1988-89
Tranmere Rovers